The Central African ambassador in Beijing is the official representative of the Government in Bangui to the Government of the People's Republic of China.

List of representatives

Central African Republic–China relations

References 

 
China
Central African Republic